Mark Joseph Gillespie (born 27 March 1992) is an English professional footballer who plays as a goalkeeper for Premier League club Newcastle United.

Club career

Early career
Gillespie was part of the academy setup at Newcastle United before moving to Carlisle United in 2008, at the age of 16. He started at Carlisle as a youth team player before graduating to the reserve team.

Carlisle United
On 20 February 2010, Gillespie was named as a substitute for Carlisle's League One match against Swindon Town due to an injury suffered by Lenny Pidgeley. He was on the bench for a further seven games before Pidgeley returned for the 2010 Football League Trophy final on 28 March 2010.

On 8 May 2010, the final day of the 2009–10 season, Gillespie made his professional debut in a win against Norwich City at Carrow Road after coming on as a late substitute. Gillespie therefore became the youngest keeper ever to represent Carlisle, at 18 years and 42 days, beating the previous record set by Tony Caig.

In the 2010–11 season, Gillespie joined Blyth Spartans, then in the Conference North, on a month-long loan. He made his first start against Eastwood Town on 16 October 2010, keeping a clean sheet. His loan was extended for a further two months before he returned to Carlisle. He made no appearances for Carlisle in either of the 2010–11 or 2011–12 seasons.

Gillespie made his first start for Carlisle in Carlisle's Football League Trophy tie against Preston North End on 4 September 2012. This ended a run of 146 consecutive starts for Adam Collin. Gillespie retained his place in the team the following Saturday, in a league fixture against Hartlepool United, after Carlisle manager Greg Abbott said that Gillespie and Collin were competing against each other for the goalkeeping position.

Gillespie was praised by Tottenham Hotspur boss André Villas-Boas and veteran keeper Carlo Cudicini after Carlisle slipped to a 3–0 defeat in a League Cup tie on 26 September. The praise was earned after Gillespie pulled off a string of fine saves to keep United in the match early on. Gillespie lost his place in the first team at the start of November 2012, after playing 13 consecutive games in two months, during which he conceded 23 goals and kept only one clean sheet (in a game against Crewe Alexandra on 18 September 2012).

He regained his place in the team one and a half months later in a 2–1 loss at Shrewsbury Town and retained it to make 37 appearances for the season. During the season, he extended his contract until the end of the 2014–15 season, while at the season's end, Collin departed the club for Rotherham United.

Gillespie's 2013–14 season was curtailed by a knee injury suffered in an FA Cup tie against Boreham Wood in November. He made no further appearances for Carlisle during the season, as the club was relegated to League Two.

Gillespie turned down a new contract from Carlisle on 7 June 2017, instead moving on to Walsall in League One.

Walsall
On 23 June 2017, Gillespie joined League One side Walsall on a two-year contract.

Motherwell
On 5 June 2018, Gillespie signed for Scottish Premiership club Motherwell on a two-year deal. He made his debut on 17 July 2018, in a Scottish League Cup group stage match at home to Edinburgh City, but was backup to Trevor Carson in league matches until November 2018 when Carson was ruled out with deep vein thrombosis. During the season Gillespie saved a penalty on four occasions; at home against Celtic, two in matches against St Johnstone, and at home to Livingston in the final game of the season. On 31 May 2020, Motherwell announced that Gillespie (who had been ever-present that season) would be leaving the club after his contract expired.

Newcastle United
On 3 July 2020, Newcastle United announced the signing of Gillespie on a three-year contract, returning to the club after twelve years.

Career statistics

Honours
Newcastle United
EFL Cup runner-up: 2022–23

References

External links

Mark Gillespie player profile at carlisleunited.co.uk

1992 births
Living people
Footballers from Newcastle upon Tyne
English footballers
Association football goalkeepers
Carlisle United F.C. players
Blyth Spartans A.F.C. players
Walsall F.C. players
Motherwell F.C. players
Newcastle United F.C. players
English Football League players
National League (English football) players
Scottish Professional Football League players